Zhang Jinan (born February 1957) is a Chinese politician who served as chief of the General Office of the Central Institutional Organization Commission of the Chinese Communist Party (CCP), and the Minister of Human Resources and Social Security.

Zhang was a member of the 18th Central Commission for Discipline Inspection.

Early life and education 
Zhang is a native of Jiexi County, Guangdong, and a member of the CCP. He graduated from the Wuhan College of Marine Transportation Engineering (now Wuhan University of Technology) with a degree in machinery manufacturing, and then received a doctorate in enterprise management from Nankai University.

Career 
Zhang has served as deputy secretary of the Tianjin Communist Youth League committee, general manager of the Hainan China Travel Service, deputy director of the Hainan Provincial CCP Committee Organization Department, and secretary of the Hainan Provincial Enterprise and Industry Committee. In April 2002, he was named to the Hainan provincial Party Standing Committee, and in May of that year began serving concurrently as the head of the provincial organization department. In January 2004, he was transferred to serve as director of the organization department of the Henan Provincial Party Committee.

In June 2004, Zhang moved to the central government, being appointed a member of the Departmental Affairs Committee of the Organization Department of the Chinese Communist Party, as well as head of the department's Second Cadre Bureau (Local Cadre Bureau). In March 2007, he was promoted to deputy director of the department. In April 2013, he was appointed to his current position of chief of the General Office of the Central Institutional Organization Commission (minister-level).

In March 2018, Zhang was appointed as the Minister of Human Resources and Social Security.

References 

1957 births
Living people
People from Jiexi County
Politicians from Jieyang
Nankai University alumni
Wuhan University of Technology alumni
People's Republic of China politicians from Guangdong
Chinese Communist Party politicians from Guangdong
Members of the 19th Central Committee of the Chinese Communist Party